Fusinus sectus is a species of sea snail, a marine gastropod mollusc in the family Fasciolariidae, the spindle snails, the tulip snails and their allies.

Description
The length of the shell attains 24.5 mm.

Distribution
This species occurs in the Atlantic Ocean off Western Sahara.

References

sectus
Gastropods described in 1897